Catocala semirelicta, the semirelict underwing,  is a moth of the family Erebidae. The species was first described by Augustus Radcliffe Grote in 1874. It is found in North America from  Nevada, Colorado, Utah, California, and Nova Scotia south to Maine, west across Canada to British Columbia, and southward in the mountains.

The length of the forewings is about 30 mm. The wingspan is 65–75 mm.

Adults are on wing from July to September in one generation depending on the location. The larvae feed on Populus balsamifera, Populus tremuloides, and Salix species. There is probably one generation per year.

Subspecies
Catocala semirelicta semirelicta Grote, 1874
Catocala semirelicta hippolyta Strecker, 1874

The latter is sometimes considered a distinct species.

References

External links
Oehlke, Bill "Catocala pura = semirelicta Hulst, 1880". The Catocala Website. Archived August 21, 2012.

Oehlke, Bill "Catocala semirelicta Guenee, 1852". The Catocala Website. Archived September 14, 2009.
Oehlke, Bill "Catocala nevadensis = semirelicta Beutenmüller, 1907". The Catocala Website. Archived August 21, 2012.

semirelict
Moths of North America
Moths described in 1874